Vijona Kryeziu (born 8 October 1997) is a Kosovan sprinter. She competed at the 2016 Summer Olympics in Rio de Janeiro, in the women's 400 metres. She was the flag bearer for Kosovo in the closing ceremony.

References

External links
 

1997 births
Living people
Kosovan female sprinters
Olympic athletes of Kosovo
Athletes (track and field) at the 2016 Summer Olympics
Athletes (track and field) at the 2018 Mediterranean Games
Mediterranean Games competitors for Kosovo
Olympic female sprinters